Srinivasa Murthy was an Indian dubbing artist who primarily worked in South Indian film industry, popularly known for dubbing Suriya's character in the Singam film series. Murthy had received a Nandi award for his work in Sivayya, awarded by the Government of Andhra Pradesh. He died of cardiac arrest on January 27, 2023, at his Chennai residence.

Career 
Murthy started his career as a dubbing artist in Tollywood in the early 1990s. He is the son of A. V. N. Murthy, who was a playback singer.

Murthy has dubbed over three Thousand films. He provided his voice to numerous non-Telugu actors, including Upendra, Jayaram in Ala Vaikunthapurramuloo, Ajith Kumar in Viswasam, Vikram in Aparichithudu, Arjun in Oke Okkadu, and Mohanlal in Janatha Garage. He also dubbed for Shah Rukh Khan and Salman Khan for their Telugu dubbed movies and notable Hollywood films. Hrithik Roshan in the Krish Series. Murthy's last work as a dubbing artist was Madhavan’s Rocketry: The Nambi Effect.

Filmography

References 

20th-century births
2023 deaths
Indian voice actors
Indian male voice actors